Sepia confusa is a species of cuttlefish native to the southwestern Indian Ocean, specifically southeastern Africa from Port Elizabeth to southern Mozambique,
Zanzibar and Pemba (5° to 30ºS), and Madagascar. S. confusa has also been erroneously recorded from the Arabian Sea. A record from the Saya-de-Malha Bank has not been confirmed by recent expeditions. The species lives at a depth of between 53 and 352 m.

Sepia confusa grows to a mantle length of 150 mm.

The type specimen was collected near Tongaat Beach, Port Elizabeth, South Africa. It is deposited at The Natural History Museum in London.

References

External links

Cuttlefish
Molluscs described in 1916